Bomb Jack is a platform game published by Tehkan for arcades in and later ported to home systems. The game was a commercial success for arcades and home computers. It was followed by several sequels: the console and computer game Mighty Bomb Jack, the arcade game Bomb Jack Twin, and Bomb Jack II which was licensed for home computers only.

Gameplay

Bomb Jack is a hero who can perform high jumps and float in the air. His goal is to collect all red bombs on the screen. The game's antagonists are enemies such as birds and mummies which, once they drop in the bottom of the screen, can morph into things like flying saucers and orbs that float around the screen, making Jack lose a life if he touches them. 

Collecting bombs will increase the bonus meter at the top of the screen (collecting lit bombs increases it more).  When the meter is completely filled up, a circular bouncing "P" appears, and when collected, it will turn all the enemies into bonus coins for a short period during which Jack may collect them.  Other similar bonuses are the B (Bonus) which increases the score multiplier (up to 5x), the E (Extra) which gives an extra life, and the rare S (Special), which awards a free game. There are five different screens in the game, each featuring a distinct scheme of platforms (the fifth has no platforms at all). There is a special bonus for collecting 21 to 23 lit bombs in a row, out of the 24 bombs of each round.

Ports

 1985: SG-1000, PC-88
 1986: Amstrad CPC, Commodore 64, ZX Spectrum, Commodore 16
 1988: Atari ST, Amiga
 1992: Game Boy
 1996: PC-98
 2003: Java ME

The Commodore 64 version uses Jean-Michel Jarre's Magnetic Fields Part II.

Reception
In Japan, Game Machine listed Bomb Jack on their May 15, 1984 issue as being the third most-successful table arcade unit of the month. The game topped the UK all-formats software sales chart in April 1986. On the machine-specific charts the C64 version reached number 1, while the Spectrum version was kept off the top of the Spectrum charts by Green Beret. Two years later, Bomb Jack returned to the top of the UK all-formats sales chart when it was re-released on the Encore budget label.

Crash magazine gave the ZX Spectrum version a 92% rating with the comment "a great arcade conversion, don't miss it", while Zzap!64 was less enthusiastic for the Commodore 64 version giving it 47%. Commodore User gave the Amiga version 6 out of 10 citing that the Amiga should be well capable of doing better on a then four-year-old arcade game.

Legacy

Sequels
Bomb Jack II is a licensed follow-up developed for 8-bit home computers by the British games publisher Elite Systems in 1986. The game went to number 2 in the UK sales charts, behind Leaderboard.

Mighty Bomb Jack was released in 1986. The game was largely identical to the original game in almost all factors, except that the same screen layouts from the first game in the same sequence were now linked in a map-like continuous form by scrolling passages. Mighty Bomb Jack got less favorable reviews than the original game.

Bomb Jack Twin was released in 1993 by NMK. In this version, two players could play simultaneously.

Re-releases
 2004: PlayStation 2 (Tecmo Hit Parade)
 2005: Xbox (Tecmo Classic Arcade)
 2007: Wii Virtual Console (NES version)
 2009: Wii Virtual Console (Arcade version)
 2012: 3DS Virtual Console (NES version)
 2014: PlayStation 4 (Arcade Archives), Wii U Virtual Console (NES version)
2019: Nintendo Switch (Arcade Archives)

References

External links
Bomb Jack at the Amiga Hall of Light
Bomb Jack at Atari Mania

1984 video games
Amiga games
Amstrad CPC games
Arcade video games
Atari ST games
Commodore 16 and Plus/4 games
Commodore 64 games
Game Boy games
Mobile games
NEC PC-8801 games
NEC PC-9801 games
Nintendo Switch games
Platform games
PlayStation 4 games
SG-1000 games
Koei Tecmo franchises
Tecmo games
Virtual Console games
ZX Spectrum games
Video games about bomb disposal
Video games developed in Japan
Video games scored by Alberto Jose González
Video games scored by Mark Cooksey
Video games set in Greece
Video games set in Egypt
Video games set in Miami
Video games set in Germany
Video games set in California
Java platform games
Hamster Corporation games